Étienne Marin Mélingue (1807–1875) was a French actor, sculptor and painter.

He was born in Caen, the son of a volunteer of 1792, He early went to Paris and obtained work as a sculptor on the church of the Madeleine, but his passion for the stage soon led him to join a strolling company of comedians. Finally chance gave him an opportunity to show his talents, and at the Porte Saint Martin he became the popular interpreter of romantic drama of the type popularized by Alexandre Dumas, père.

One of his greatest successes was as Benvenuto Cellini, in which he displayed his ability both as an actor and as a sculptor, really modelling before the eyes of the audience a statue of Hebe. He sent a number of statuettes to the various exhibitions, notably one of Gilbert Louis Duprez as William Tell. Mélingue's wife, Théodorine Thiesset (1813–1886), was the actress selected by Victor Hugo to create the part of Guanhumara in Burgraves at the Comédie-Française, where she remained ten years. He created the part of D'Artagnan in The Youth of The Musketeers and The Musketeer (a dramatization of 20 Years After by Dumas) and also the part of Lagardere in Feval and Anciet-Bourgeois's Hunchback.

References

External links and reference
 
 Dumas, Une Vie d'artiste; Aventures et tribulations d'un comédien (1854).
 Étienne Mélingue caricature

1808 births
1875 deaths
Artists from Caen
French male stage actors
19th-century French sculptors
French male sculptors
19th-century French male actors
19th-century French male artists
Actors from Caen